Riverdale is the school district in the U.S. state of Wisconsin serving Muscoda, Blue River, Avoca, and surrounding areas of Crawford, Grant, Iowa, and Richland Counties.

Riverdale Junior and Senior High School, is the district's junior high school and high school, and Riverdale Elementary School is the district's elementary school.

External links
Riverdale School District

School districts in Wisconsin
Education in Crawford County, Wisconsin
Education in Grant County, Wisconsin
Education in Iowa County, Wisconsin
Education in Richland County, Wisconsin